Duke of Devonshire is a title in the Peerage of England held by members of the Cavendish family. This (now the senior) branch of the Cavendish family has been one of the wealthiest British aristocratic families since the 16th century and has been rivalled in political influence perhaps only by the Marquesses of Salisbury and the Earls of Derby.

History
Although the Cavendish family estates are centred in Derbyshire, they hold the titles of "Duke of Devonshire" and their subsidiary title of earldom of Devonshire (neither peerage is related to the ancient title of Earl of Devon). The first Earl may have chosen "Devonshire" simply because places and lands he was associated with were already attached to existing peerages at the College of Arms. The title remains associated with "Devonshire" even though in modern usage it is the county of Devon. Another reason for the choice of a non-local or regional name was to avoid antagonising the powerful Stanley family from the Midlands who had strong associations with Derbyshire since their ancestors had been gifted estates in the county by William the Conqueror, and they had also been the Earls of Derby since the late 15th century. (See British peerage ranks)

Every Duke of Devonshire has so far been appointed a Knight of the Garter, except the present one.

Cavendish knights, and the 1st Earl of Devonshire

The Cavendish family descends from Sir John Cavendish, who took his name from the village of Cavendish, Suffolk, where he held an estate in the 14th century. He served as Chief Justice of the King's Bench from 1372 to 1381, and was killed in the Peasants' Revolt in 1381. Two of his great-grandsons were George Cavendish, Thomas Cardinal Wolsey's biographer, and George's younger brother Sir William Cavendish. Sir William gained great wealth from his position in the Exchequer and also (allegedly) from unfairly taking advantage of the dissolution of the Monasteries. He married (1547) as his third wife the famous Bess of Hardwick, with whom he had eight children. One of their sons, Sir Charles Cavendish (1553–1617), was the father of William Cavendish, 1st Duke of Newcastle-upon-Tyne (1592–1676; see Duke of Newcastle-upon-Tyne for more information on this branch of the family), while another son, Henry Cavendish, was the ancestor of the Barons Waterpark. Yet another son, William Cavendish (1552–1626), was a politician and a supporter of the colonization of Virginia. In 1605 he was raised to the peerage as Baron Cavendish, of Hardwicke in the County of Derby, and in 1618 he was further honoured when he was made Earl of Devonshire. Both titles are in the Peerage of England.

The 2nd Earl of Devonshire and the first five Dukes of Devonshire
He was succeeded by his eldest son, William Cavendish, 2nd Earl of Devonshire, who served as Lord-Lieutenant of Derbyshire and was a patron of the philosopher Thomas Hobbes (1588–1679). On his early death in 1628 the titles passed to his son, William Cavendish, 3rd Earl of Devonshire, who also served as Lord-Lieutenant of Derbyshire. He was succeeded by his son, the fourth Earl. He was a strong supporter of the Glorious Revolution of 1688 and later served under William III and Mary II as Lord Steward of the Household. In 1694 he was created Marquess of Hartington and Duke of Devonshire in the Peerage of England. He was succeeded by his eldest son, the second Duke, who held political office as Lord President of the Council and Lord Privy Seal and was also Lord-Lieutenant of Devonshire. His eldest son, the third Duke, served as Lord Privy Seal, as Lord Steward of the Household and (from 1737 to 1745) as Lord-Lieutenant of Ireland.

On his death the titles passed to his eldest son, the fourth Duke, who was a prominent politician. He was summoned to the House of Lords through a writ of acceleration in his father's junior title of Baron Cavendish, of Hardwicke in 1751 and served as First Lord of the Treasury and titular Prime Minister of Great Britain from 1756 to 1757. Devonshire married Charlotte Boyle, 6th Baroness Clifford, daughter of the famous architect Richard Boyle, 3rd Earl of Burlington (on whose death in 1753 the earldom of Burlington became extinct). Their third and youngest son Lord George Cavendish was recreated Earl of Burlington in 1831. Devonshire was succeeded by his eldest son, William Cavendish, who became the fifth Duke of Devonshire. He had already succeeded his mother as seventh Baron Clifford in 1754. He served as Lord-Lieutenant of Derbyshire from 1782 to 1811 but is best remembered for his first marriage (1774) to Lady Georgiana Spencer (1757–1806), the celebrated beauty and society hostess.

The sixth, seventh and eighth Dukes
 
Their only son, the sixth Duke, served as Lord Chamberlain of the Household from 1827 to 1828 and from 1830 to 1834. Known as the "Bachelor Duke", he never married and on his death in 1858 the barony of Clifford fell into abeyance between his sisters. He was succeeded in the other titles by his first cousin once removed, the second Earl of Burlington, who became the seventh Duke (see the Earl of Burlington for earlier history of this branch of the family). He was the son of William Cavendish, eldest son of the aforementioned first Earl of Burlington, youngest son of the fourth Duke. He was Lord-Lieutenant of Lancashire and Derbyshire and Chancellor of the University of London and of the University of Cambridge. He was succeeded by his second, but eldest surviving son, the eighth Duke. The eighth Duke was a noted statesman and the most famous member of the Cavendish family. Known under his courtesy title of Marquess of Hartington until 1891, he held political office for a period spanning 40 years, notably as Secretary of State for India and as Secretary of State for War, and three times declined to become Prime Minister. He married Louise, Dowager Duchess of Manchester, who became known as the "Double Duchess".

The ninth, tenth and eleventh Dukes
Devonshire died childless and was succeeded by his nephew, the ninth Duke. He was the eldest son of Lord Edward Cavendish, third son of the seventh Duke. He was a Conservative politician and served as Governor-General of Canada from 1916 to 1921 and as Secretary of State for the Colonies from 1922 to 1924.

His elder son, the tenth Duke, also a Conservative politician, served as Under-Secretary of State for Dominion Affairs, as Under-Secretary of State for India and Burma and as Under-Secretary of State for the Colonies. He married Lady Mary Gascoyne-Cecil, who was Mistress of the Robes to Queen Elizabeth II from 1953 to 1966. Their elder son and heir apparent William Cavendish, Marquess of Hartington, married Kathleen Kennedy, daughter of Joseph Kennedy and sister of the future President of the United States, John Fitzgerald Kennedy. Lord Hartington was killed in the Second World War in 1944 shortly after the marriage. The couple had no children.

Devonshire was therefore succeeded by his second and only surviving son, the eleventh Duke. He sat on the Conservative benches in the House of Lords and held political office (under his uncle Harold Macmillan and later under Sir Alec Douglas-Home) from 1960 to 1964. Devonshire married the Hon. Deborah Mitford, the youngest of the famous Mitford sisters. As of 2022, the titles are held by their second and only surviving son, Peregrine Cavendish, 12th Duke of Devonshire, who succeeded in 2004.

The ninth and tenth dukes both served as Chancellor of the University of Leeds.

Other notable members of the Cavendish family
Numerous other members of the Cavendish family have also gained distinction. Lord Henry Cavendish (1673–1700), second son of the first Duke, was Member of Parliament for Derby. Lord James Cavendish (died 1751), third son of the first Duke, also represented this constituency in the House of Commons. Lord Charles Cavendish (1704–1783), second son of the second Duke, was a politician and scientist. His son Henry Cavendish (1731–1810) was an influential scientist noted for his discovery of hydrogen. Lord James Cavendish (1701–1741), third son of the second Duke, was a soldier and briefly represented Malton in Parliament. Lord George Cavendish (died 1794), second son of the third Duke, was a long-standing Member of Parliament and served as Comptroller of the Household from 1761 to 1762. Lord Frederick Cavendish, third son of the third Duke, was a Field Marshal in the Army. Lord John Cavendish, fourth son of the third Duke, was a politician and served as Chancellor of the Exchequer in 1782 and 1783.

Lord Richard Cavendish, second son of the fourth Duke, represented Lancaster and Derbyshire in the House of Commons. Lady Dorothy Cavendish, daughter of the fourth Duke, married Prime Minister William Cavendish-Bentinck, 3rd Duke of Portland (who assumed the additional surname of Cavendish). Augustus Clifford, illegitimate son by the fifth Duke and his mistress and later second wife Elizabeth Hervey, was a naval commander and was created a baronet in 1838 (see Clifford baronets). William Cavendish, eldest son of the first Earl of Burlington and father of the seventh Duke, represented Aylesbury and Derby in Parliament. George Henry Compton Cavendish, second son of the first Earl of Burlington, was Member of Parliament for Aylesbury. The Hon. Henry Frederick Compton Cavendish, third son of the first Earl of Burlington, was a general in the Army. The Hon. Charles Compton Cavendish, fourth son of the first Earl of Burlington, was created Baron Chesham in 1858.

Lord Frederick Cavendish, third son of the seventh Duke, was a Liberal politician. He had just been appointed Chief Secretary for Ireland in 1882 when he was assassinated by nationalists in Phoenix Park, Dublin. His wife Lady Frederick (Lucy) Cavendish was a pioneer of women's education. Lord Edward Cavendish, fourth and youngest son of the seventh Duke, sat as Member of Parliament for several constituencies. His second son Lord Richard Cavendish represented North Lonsdale in Parliament. In 1911 he was one of the proposed recipients of peerages in case the Bill that was to become the Parliament Act 1911 was not accepted by the House of Lords. His grandson Hugh Cavendish was created a life peer as Baron Cavendish of Furness in 1990. Lady Dorothy Cavendish, daughter of the ninth Duke, was the wife of Prime Minister Harold Macmillan.

Courtesy titles and family seats
The Duke of Devonshire's eldest son may use the courtesy title Marquess of Hartington, whilst the eldest son of the eldest son may use the title Earl of Burlington, and his eldest son may use the title Lord Cavendish.

The family seats are Chatsworth House, Bolton Abbey in Yorkshire, and Lismore Castle in Co Waterford, in the Republic of Ireland. Compton Place in Eastbourne belongs to the family (which developed Eastbourne as a seaside resort in the 19th century) but is let. In 1908 Holker Hall, then in Lancashire, now in Cumbria, was left to a junior branch of the family. The family previously owned Londesborough Hall, Yorkshire; Hardwick Hall, Derbyshire; Chiswick House, Middlesex; and two London mansions on Piccadilly: Devonshire House and Burlington House. In 1907 the Duke owned 192,322 acres across the British Isles, principally in Derbyshire, Yorkshire, County Cork and County Waterford.

The traditional burial place of the Dukes of Devonshire is at St Peter's Church, Edensor, in the closest village to Chatsworth House. The ducal graves can be found on the highest spot of Edensor's churchyard in the Cavendish family plot.

Earls of Devonshire (1618)
Other titles: Baron Cavendish of Hardwick, in the county of Derby (1605)
William Cavendish, 1st Earl of Devonshire (1552–1626) was an English courtier
William Cavendish, 2nd Earl of Devonshire (1591–1628), eldest son of the 1st Earl
William Cavendish, 3rd Earl of Devonshire (1617–1684), elder son of the 2nd Earl
William Cavendish, 4th Earl of Devonshire (1640–1707) was created Duke of Devonshire in 1694

Dukes of Devonshire (1694)
Other titles: Marquess of Hartington, in the county of Derby (1694), Earl of Devonshire (1618) and Baron Cavendish of Hardwick, in the county of Derby (1605)

William Cavendish, 1st Duke of Devonshire (1640–1707), only son of the 3rd Earl 
William Cavendish, 2nd Duke of Devonshire (1673–1729), eldest son of the 1st Duke
William Cavendish, 3rd Duke of Devonshire (1698–1755), eldest son of the 2nd Duke
William Cavendish, 4th Duke of Devonshire (1720–1764), eldest son of the 3rd Duke
Other titles (5th & 6th Dukes): Baron Clifford (1628)
William Cavendish, 5th Duke of Devonshire (1748–1811), eldest son of the 4th Duke
William George Spencer Cavendish, 6th Duke of Devonshire (1790–1858), only son of the 5th Duke, was called "The Bachelor Duke" and died unmarried
Other titles (7th Duke onwards): Earl of Burlington and Baron Cavendish of Keighley, in the county of York (1831)
William Cavendish, 7th Duke of Devonshire (1808–1891), eldest son of William Cavendish (1783–1812), eldest son of The 1st Earl of Burlington (by the second creation; 1754–1834), third son of the 4th Duke
Spencer Compton Cavendish, 8th Duke of Devonshire (1833–1908), second son of the 7th Duke, died without issue
Victor Christian William Cavendish, 9th Duke of Devonshire (1868–1938), eldest son of Lt.-Col. Lord Edward Cavendish (1838–1891), fourth son of the 7th Duke
Edward William Spencer Cavendish, 10th Duke of Devonshire (1895–1950), eldest son of the 9th Duke
William John Robert Cavendish, Marquess of Hartington (1917–1944), elder son of the 10th Duke, was killed in action in World War II, without issue
Andrew Robert Buxton Cavendish, 11th Duke of Devonshire (1920–2004), second and younger son of the 10th Duke
Mark Cavendish (born 1941), eldest son of the 11th Duke, died in infancy
Peregrine Andrew Morny "Stoker" Cavendish, 12th Duke of Devonshire (born 1944), second son of the 11th Duke

The heir apparent is the present holder's only son, William "Bill Burlington" Cavendish, Earl of Burlington (born 1969), married to Laura Montagu (née Roundell).

The heir-in-line is Lord Burlington's second child and only son, James, Lord Cavendish (born 15 December 2010).  Lord Burlington, although entitled to use the courtesy title Marquess of Hartington has continued to be styled by the Burlington title since his father succeeded as 12th Duke.

Family tree

Line of succession (simplified)

  William Cavendish, 4th Duke of Devonshire (1720–1764)
 George Cavendish, 1st Earl of Burlington (1754–1834)
William Cavendish (1783–1812)
 William Cavendish, 7th Duke of Devonshire, 7th Marquess of Hartington, 2nd Earl of Burlington (1808–1891)
Lt-Col. Lord Edward Cavendish (1838–1891)
 Victor Cavendish, 9th Duke of Devonshire (1868–1938)
 Edward Cavendish, 10th Duke of Devonshire (1895–1950)
 Andrew Cavendish, 11th Duke of Devonshire (1920–2004)
 Peregrine Cavendish, 12th Duke of Devonshire (born 1944)
(1) William Cavendish, Earl of Burlington (b. 1969)
(2) James, Lord Cavendish (b. 2010)
Rt. Hon. Lord Richard Cavendish (1871–1946)
Richard Edward Osborne Cavendish (1917–1972)
 (3) Hugh Cavendish, Baron Cavendish of Furness (b. 1941)
(4) Hon. Frederick Richard Toby Cavendish (b. 1972)
(5)Henry Aurelian William Cavendish (b.2014)
(6) Alfred George Augustus Cavendish (b. 2021)
(7) Edward Osborne Cavendish (b. 1955)
General Hon. Henry Cavendish (1789–1873)William Henry Frederick Cavendish (1817–1881)Cecil Charles Cavendish (1855–1931)Brigadier Ronald Valentine Cecil Cavendish (1896–1943)Maj-Gen. Peter Boucher Cavendish (1925–2011)male issue in lineRobin Francis Cavendish (1930–1994)male issue in lineFrancis William Henry Cavendish (1820–1893)Reginald Richard Frederick Cavendish (1857–1941)
Godfrey Lionel John Cavendish (1884–1914)
Hubert Gordon Compton Cavendish (1913–1993)
male issue in lineErnest Lionel Francis Cavendish (1863–1946)Alwyn Lionel Compton Cavendish (1890–1928)Charles Francis Alwyn Compton Cavendish (1919–2009)male issue in lineGeorge Henry Cavendish (1824–1889)William Henry Alexander George Delmar Cavendish (1849–1919)Charles Alfred William Delmar (1878–1939)Richard Blake Delmar Cavendish (1916–1980)male issue in lineWilliam Henry George Cavendish (1886–1965)Edwin Pearson Delmar Cavendish (1908–1970)Adrian Delmar Cavendish (1947–2019)male issue in lineWilliam Delmar Cavendish (1911–1997)male issue in line
 Charles Cavendish, 1st Baron Chesham (1793–1863) Barons CheshamEarls of Devonshire
The earldom of Devonshire was originally granted as a recreation of the title held by the last Baron Mountjoy, which became extinct on his death in 1606.

It is a separate title from that of Earl of Devon, which still belongs to the Courtenay family.

In fiction
The fifth Duke and Duchess of Devonshire are portrayed in the 2008 film The Duchess directed by Saul Dibb.  The film is based on Amanda Foreman's biography of the scandalous 18th-century English aristocrat Georgiana Cavendish, Duchess of Devonshire (portrayed by Keira Knightley) and her relationship with the Duke (Ralph Fiennes) and his next wife, Lady Elizabeth Foster.

Along with Jane Austen, the fifth Duke and his second wife appear, soon after Georgiana's death, in Jane and the Stillroom Maid, a murder mystery by Stephanie Barron.

In John Buchan's novel The Three Hostages (1924), 'the late Duke of Devonshire' is cited as an epitome of Englishness. This probably refers to the eighth duke.

In the episode 'The Man in the Killer Suit' in the 2014 TV series Forever, a case occurs where someone masquerades as a 'viscount cavendish'. While the title is wrongly used, other references during the episode show that they are in fact referring to the Dukes of Devonshire.

See also
Duchess of Devonshire
Earl of Devonshire
Duke of Newcastle-upon-Tyne (1665 creation) 
Earl of Burlington
Baron Chesham
Baron Clifford
Baron Waterpark
Thomas Cavendish known as "The Navigator"
Chatsworth (TV series), documentary about Chatsworth House

Further reading
Pearson, John. The Serpent and the Stag. Holt, Rinehart, & Winston, 1984.

 References 

Sources

Kidd, Charles, Williamson, David (editors). Debrett's Peerage and Baronetage'' (1990 edition). New York: St Martin's Press, 1990,

External links

 www.burkespeerage.com

Dukedoms in the Peerage of England
Devonshire
History of Devon
1694 establishments in England
Noble titles created in 1694
British landowners